Scambi (Exchanges) is an electronic music composition by the Belgian composer Henri Pousseur, realized in 1957 at the Studio di fonologia musicale di Radio Milano.

History
Scambi is Pousseur's second electronic-music work, following Seismogramme I–II (Seismograms I–II)—one of the seven works which had been presented in October 1954 on the first concert of full-scale compositions produced in the Electronic-Music Studio of the NWDR. Pousseur at this time had obligations as a schoolteacher in Malmedy and so could only come intermittently to work in the Cologne studio, where his friend Karlheinz Stockhausen helped carry out the technical realisation. His work on Scambi by contrast brought him into direct contact with the work of actually realising electronic music.

In the summer of 1956, at the Darmstädter Ferienkurse, Pousseur met Luciano Berio, who invited him to come to Milan to work at the Studio di fonologia musicale of Radio Milan. On his way to Milan on the train in the spring of 1957, Pousseur formulated two goals for his new work. First, he wanted to design the work in a way that permitted the listener to participate in its temporal formation, which meant it would be composed of a number of small elements which could be arranged in different ways. Second, it seemed necessary at that time to use material that avoided the periodic character of traditional music, including the internal structure of the sounds themselves. This meant starting from noise—white noise—and filtering it to produce a range of noisy sounds with different degrees of relative pitch. This came as an extension of the post-Webernian goal of exploring structures opposed to traditional ones, especially in the area of harmony, so that, in place of the concepts of polarity and causality of traditional musical thinking, "" (everything should remain in suspension), as Webern put it.

A third factor preoccupied Pousseur: the time available to carry out the work was relatively short. Consequently, it was necessary to find relatively quick methods for the generation and formation of the material. This was an important factor in deciding on techniques that deviated from the microstructural devices accepted almost exclusively in electronic composition until the present time.

At the Studio di fonologia, Pousseur discovered a special filter designed by Dr Alfredo Lietti, the technical director of the studio. This device enabled selecting, by setting the filter's threshold, material from a complex sound phenomenon, or the opposite, progressively increasing the attenuation. In other words, various more or less dense "skimmed off" bandwidths can be isolated from the same stockpile of sounds. Studio technician Marino Zuccheri assisted Pousseur in compiling a supply of suitable sounds for his composition.

Analysis
The starting-point for Scambi is a collection of sound material that is globally statistical. By means of devices that enable transformation techniques, elements are selected from electronically generated white noise. Various frequency bands were isolated, each with a bandwidth of half an octave, and from each of these a sequence is filtered using an amplitude selector. The output is randomly determined by whichever sounds happen to emerge above the filter's threshold. These sequences, which already fluctuate in frequency around average values, are then made to centre on nine different pitch levels. On each one, a directed motion of change in density is imposed in which the direction is not linear, but rather travels in a spiral fashion. An acceleration machine is then used to give each sequence a rising or falling pitch tendency, within which the motion is not even, but is disturbed by small internal deviations in contrary directions. This material is then reduced to four basic structural types, each characterised by a double tendency: on the one hand, movement from high to low or from low to high, and on the other from fast to slow, or from slow to fast.

Rhythms, too, are intentionally irregular and unpredictable. Details of the music are therefore "imprecise". On the whole, only general motions are heard—general speeds or changes of speeds—with abrupt breaks occurring even within these tendencies.

A second structural level opposes this essentially discontinuous material with contrasting, long-sustained, continuous sounds, again in four types of shape. These two four-fold classes of structures are blended in various degrees to produce sixteen intermodulated structural types. Together with their retrogrades, a total of thirty-two sequences are generated: high-fast-discontinuous changing to high-slow-continuous, low-slow-discontinuous changing to low-fast-continuous, high -fast discontinuous changing to high-slow-discontinuous, and so on.

Once having produced these thirty-two sequences, Pousseur regarded the work as complete, though with an enormous number of possible realisations—an aleatory principle which had been intended from the outset.

Scambi is unusual for an electronic work in having a mobile structure. It consists of sixteen pairs of segments (called "layers" by Pousseur) that may be assembled in many different ways. Pousseur's original idea was to supply these layers on separate reels of tape, so that the listener could assemble his own version. When first created, several different versions were realized, two by Luciano Berio, one by Marc Wilkinson, and two by the composer himself—a longer one of about six-and-a-half minutes and a shorter one lasting just over four minutes. One of Berio's versions is shorter still at 3:25.) Pousseur established two principles for linking the segments together. The first is that there should be as complete a conformity in character as possible between the end of one segment and the beginning of the next, with the objective of accomplishing transitions as imperceptible as possible. The second is that the formal course should be marked by the successive dominance of the different characters. The process of assembly was complicated by the fact that the sequences were not all the same length, but it was not required that all thirty-two segments necessarily appear in all versions. Though Pousseur followed these rules himself, he regarded them only as suggestions, and Berio and Wilkinson did not conform to them when making their versions. Berio's structures, for example, are marked by an even distribution of the various characters, while Wilkinson's connections emphasize effects of contrast.

Reception
Initially, Scambi was not met with universal acclaim, even within Pousseur's immediate circle of colleagues. Pierre Boulez attended a concert of electronic music from Milan, given at Darmstadt on 26 July 1957, in which two versions of Scambi were presented, along with Mutazione and Perspectives by Luciano Berio and Notturno by Bruno Maderna. In a letter to his friend Stockhausen, Boulez reported:

In his influential early book Opera aperta, Umberto Eco, on the other hand, cites Scambi, together with Stockhausen's Klavierstück XI, Berio's Sequenza I, and Boulez's Third Piano Sonata, as musical exemplars of the "open work", alongside the literary models of Verlaine's Art Poétique, Kafka's The Trial and The Castle, and James Joyce's Ulysses and Finnegans Wake. For Eco, Scambi represents a "fresh advance" by pointing within the category of "open" works to a narrower category of "works in movement" consisting of "unplanned or physically incomplete structural units", related to products of visual art like Alexander Calder's mobiles and Mallarmé's Livre. It is evident from the vocabulary used by Eco that it is Pousseur's work that had the greatest impact on his thinking. Scambi was the first open-form work of electronic music—a mobile of electronic sounds.

Legacy
Beginning in 2004, the Scambi Project, directed by John Dack at the Lansdown Centre for Electronic Arts at Middlesex University, has focussed on this work and its multiple possibilities for realization.

Discography
 Panorama des musiques expérimentales. Works by Luciano Berio, Bruno Maderna, Iannis Xenakis, François Dufrêne, Herbert Eimert, Pierre Henry, György Ligeti, Luc Ferrari, Mauricio Kagel, André Boucourechliev, and Henri Pousseur. LP recording, 2 discs: 33⅓ rpm, stereo, 12 in. Philips A 00565 L and A 00566 L. Amsterdam, Philips, 1966. Reissued as Panorama of Experimental Music. Mercury SR-2-9123 (set); SR 90478—SR 90479; [United States]: Mercury, 1968. [Pousseur's long version (6:22) of Scambi]. Second disc (including Scambi) reissued separately as Panorama electronique / Electronic Experimental Music. LP recording 1 sound disc: analog, 33⅓ rpm, stereo, 12 in. Limelight LS-86048. [S.l.]: Limelight, n.d.
 Acousmatrix—History of Electronic Music 4: Henri Pousseur: Scambi [Pousseur's long version (6:27)]; Trois visages de Liège ; Paraboles-mix. CD recording, 1 sound disc: digital, 4¾ in. BV Haast Records CD 9010. Also issued as part of the 9-CD boxed set, Acousmatrix: The History of Electronic Music. BV Haast 0206. Amsterdam: BV Haast Records, 1996. Reissued 2006. Same version of Scambi reissued with other material on An Anthology of Noise and Electronic Music. Volume #1. With music by Luigi Russolo; Tony Conrad; John Cale; Otomo Yoshihide; Martin Tétreault; Antonio Russolo; Walter Ruttmann; Pierre Schaeffer; Gordon Mumma; Angus MacLise; Philip Jeck; Konrad Boehmer; Nam June Paik; John Cage; Edgard Varèse; Iannis Xenakis; Paul D. Miller; Pauline Oliveros; Ryoji Ikeda. CD recording, 2 sound discs: digital ; 4 3/4 in. Sub Rosa SR190; Sub Rosa EFA 27682-2. Brussels: Sub Rosa, 2002.
 Forbidden Planets: Music from the Pioneers of Electronic Sound. [Unknown version of Scambi, probably the same as on Acousmatrix 4]. With music by Robert Beyer, Bebe and Louis Barron, Miklós Rózsa, Pierre Schaeffer, Bernard Herrmann, Herbert Eimert, John Cage, Karlheinz Stockhausen, Paul Gredinger, Hermann Heiss, Iannis Xenakis, Dick Raaijmakers, Tom Dissevelt, Edgard Varèse, György Ligeti, and Henk Badings. CD recording, 2 sound discs: digital, 4¾ in. Chrome Dreams CDCD5033. New Malden, Surrey, UK, 2009.

References

Sources

Further reading

 Dack, John. 2009. "The Electroacoustic Music of Henri Pousseur and the 'Open' Form". In The Modernist Legacy: Essays on New Music, edited by Björn Heile, 177–189. Farnham: Ashgate. .
 Decroupet, Pascal. 2003. "De l'analyse génétique à la recomposition: Esquisse d'une méthodologie d'analyse pour musiques sur support". Musicorum, no. 2:61–86.
 Doati, Roberto. 1992. "Il caso filtrato: Scambi di Henri Pousseur". I quaderni della Civica Scuola di Musica: 21–22.
 Harley, James. 2005. "An Anthology of Noise & Electronic Music" (CD review). Computer Music Journal 29, no. 3 (Autumn): 98–104.
 Pousseur, Henri. 1959. "Scambi". Gravesaner Blätter 4:36–47 (German), 48–54 (English). Italian translation in La musica elettronica: Testi scelti e commentati da Henri Pousseur, 135–147. Milan: Feltrinelli, 1972, French version, as "Scambi—description d'un travail (1959)". In Pousseur, Ecrits théoriques, 1954–1967, edited by Pascal Decroupet, 147–159. Collection musique, musicologie. Sprimont: Editions Pierre Mardaga, 2004. .
 Pousseur, Henri. 2002. "Die Zeit der Parabeln (1972/73): Beschreibung einer Arbeit im Studio für Elektronische Musik des WDR Köln (1972)", translated by Hélèna Bernatchez. In Komposition und Musikwissenschaft im Dialog II (1999): Henri Pousseur: Parabeln und Spiralen: zwei Hauptaspekte eines Lebenswerkes, edited by Imke Misch and Christoph von Blumröder, 70–92. Signale aus Köln. Münster: Lit-Verlag. 
 Pousseur, Henri, Christoph von Blumröder, Thomas Böhm, and Flo Menezes. 2008. "Hommage an Henri Poussuer zum 75. Geburtstag: ein Gespräch zum Thema 'Lektüren' mit Scambi und Trois visages de Liège". In Komposition und Musikwissenschaft im Dialog VI (2004–2006) , edited by Marcus Erbe and Christoph von Blumröder, 101–115. Signale aus Köln 12. Vienna: Verlag der Apfel. .
 Smith Brindle, Reginald. 1958. "Reports from Abroad: Italy: The R.A.I. Studio di Fonologia Musicale at Milan". The Musical Times 99, no. 1380 (February): 98.

External links
 The Scambi Project
 Listen to Scambi

Compositions by Henri Pousseur
20th-century classical music
1957 compositions
Electronic compositions
Serial compositions